Western United Football Club is an Australian professional association football club based in Truganina, Melbourne. The club was formed in 2017 as Western Melbourne before it was shortly renamed to Western United.

There has been two permanent managers of Western United since 2019. Former Wellington Phoenix coach, Mark Rudan was the first to manage the club while John Aloisi currently manages the club.

Managers
 Only first-team competitive matches are counted. Wins, losses and draws are results at the final whistle; the results of penalty shoot-outs are not counted.
 Statistics are complete up to and including the match played on 17 February 2023.
Key
 M = matches played; W = matches won; D = matches drawn; L = matches lost; GF = Goals for; GA = Goals against; Win % = percentage of total matches won
   Managers with this background and symbol in the "Name" column are italicised to denote caretaker appointments.
   Managers with this background and symbol in the "Name" column are italicised to denote caretaker appointments promoted to full-time manager.

References

Western United FC managers
Western United